Merxmuellera is a genus of African grasses
named for Hermann Merxmueller, a 20th century German botanist and taxonomist who was an expert on African flora.

Species
Merxmuellera contains the following species:
 Merxmuellera ambalavaoensis (A.Camus) Conert - Madagascar
 Merxmuellera davyi (C.E.Hubb.) Conert - Malawi, Mozambique, Zimbabwe, Limpopo
 Merxmuellera drakensbergensis (Schweick.) Conert - Cape Province, Lesotho, Free State, KwaZulu-Natal, Mpumalanga, Limpopo
Merxmuellera grandiflora (Hochst. ex A.Rich.) H.P.Linder - Ethiopia
 Merxmuellera macowanii (Stapf) Conert - Cape Province, Lesotho, Free State, KwaZulu-Natal, Mpumalanga, Limpopo, Madagascar
 Merxmuellera stereophylla (J.G.Anderson) Conert - Lesotho, Free State, KwaZulu-Natal, Mpumalanga, Limpopo
 Merxmuellera tsaratananensis (A.Camus) Conert - Madagascar

Formerly included

Merxmuellera formerly contained the following species:

See also
List of Poaceae genera

References

Danthonioideae
Poaceae genera
Taxa named by Charles Edward Hubbard